Adadi was the name of a rabbinical family in Tripoli, Libya. Notable people with the surname include:

Abraham Hayyim Adadi (1801–1874)
Nathan Adadi (1740–1818)
Saul Adadi (1850–1918)

Other uses
Adadi Mariam, Ethiopian church

Maghrebi Jewish surnames